The Wuhan–Jiujiang passenger railway is a high-speed railway line in China's Hubei Province and Jiangxi Province, eastern China. 

The Wuhan–Jiujiang passenger railway follows a similar route to the pre-existing Wuhan–Jiujiang Railway. Presumably, once the former is opened, it will take over a large portion of passenger traffic from the latter.

Construction
Its first section, from Wuhan to Daye, coincides with the Wuhan–Huangshi line of the Wuhan Metropolitan Area intercity railway. It opened on June 12, 2017.

The construction of the Daye-Jiujiang section started in 2013–2014. It started operations on September 21, 2017.

At Jiujiang, the Wuhan–Jiujiang passenger railway will connect with the Nanchang–Jiujiang intercity railway (opened in 2010), thus providing a continuous high-speed line between Nanchang and Wuhan.

References

High-speed railway lines in China
Rail transport in Hubei
Rail transport in Jiangxi
Jiujiang
Transport in Wuhan
Railway lines opened in 2017